Movik is a village in Tromsø Municipality in Troms og Finnmark county, Norway. It is located along the Tromsøysundet strait on the mainland part of the municipality.

References

Villages in Troms
Populated places of Arctic Norway
Tromsø